The Secretary of State of the State of Oklahoma is the chief clerical officer of Oklahoma and a member of the Oklahoma Governor's Cabinet. The Secretary of State is the only appointed constitutional member of the executive branch of the Oklahoma state government. The office of Secretary of State was elective from statehood until 1975 when the Constitution was amended and it became an appointive office, running concurrent with the Governor effective in 1979.

Democrat John Rogers served the longest in office, having been elected three times to serve.  He only served eight and one-half years, however, when he resigned just six months after taking office for the third time for a four-year term. The shortest term of any Secretary of State was just nine days, served by H.G. Oliver in 1915.  He was appointed to fill the job after the resignation of B.F. Harrison.  He left office when newly elected S.L. Lyon took office on January 15, 1915.  Although she was named as "interim" by Governor Mary Fallin and served only one month, Republican Michelle Day is considered the 31st Secretary of State.

Constitutional requirements
The Oklahoma Constitution sets the requirements to hold the office of Secretary of State: the appointee must be a citizen of the State of Oklahoma, at least thirty-one years of age and a resident of the United States for ten years, the same as all high-level executive branch officials.

Appointment
The Governor appoints, with confirmation by the Oklahoma Senate, the Secretary of State to serve a four-year term that runs concurrently with the term of the Governor. As the office is not elective (the only appointive constitutional office in Oklahoma), a Secretary of State may succeed himself/herself in office as many times as the Governor-elect appoints and the state Senate confirms him or her.

Official duties

Executive functions
The Secretary of State is required by law to attest to the Governor's signature and to file all the official acts of the Governor. Executive orders, appointments and proclamations signed and issued by the Governor are certified and distributed by the Secretary of State. Original certificates of pardons and paroles, including revocation of same are recorded and filed in the Office of the Secretary of State. Extraditions, both foreign and domestic, are also recorded and maintained by the Secretary. The office is the custodian of the Seal of Oklahoma. The Secretary of State is an ex officio member of the Oklahoma Governor's Cabinet.

As required by the Oklahoma Administrative Procedures Act and Executive Order 88-16, the Secretary of State is responsible for overseeing and operating the Office of Administrative Rules (OAR). ORA files all rules, rule making notices, and executive orders issued by all state agencies and the Governor. OAR collects all such rules and represents them to the Governor for his approve or disapproval. With very limited exceptions, no agency rule may be enforced until it is filed with OAR, approved by the Governor, and then published by OAR.

The most important, though ceremonial, function of the Secretary of State is to "sacredly preserve" the original State Constitution signed in 1907.

Legislative functions
After legislation has been passed and signed by the Governor, along with the President of the Senate and Speaker of the House, the Secretary of State is required to fill and record the original acts in the Office of the Secretary of State. Each act is designated a chapter number and published in the Oklahoma Session Laws and the Oklahoma Statutes. The Secretary of State is also required to distribute copies of all new laws, as soon as possible, to each of the seventy-seven County Court Clerks. The original acts and resolutions are bound into volumes and then preserved by the Secretary's office.

Any and all initiatives, petitions, and referendum (called State Questions) are filled with the Secretary and addressed to the Governor. After circulation of the petition, the Secretary's office counts and binds the signature pamphlets. If the signatures are sufficient, the state question is placed on the ballot for a vote of the people. New laws adopted by the people are published in the Oklahoma Statutes or Oklahoma Constitution and are immune from override by the Oklahoma Legislature, Governor of Oklahoma, or the Oklahoma Supreme Court.

Judicial functions
Under the provision of the Oklahoma Constitution, the judges of any court exercising judicial power shall be subject to removal from office, or to compulsory retirement from office by the Oklahoma Court on the Judiciary. The Secretary of State is required to determine and designate five district judges to serve on the Appellate Division and eight district judges to serve on the Trial Division of the Court on Judiciary. Every odd-numbered year this office is responsible for organizing the meeting for the Court on Judiciary to make or amend their rules of procedure as mandated by the Oklahoma Constitution.

Certification functions
The main duties of the Secretary of State revolve around filling, recording, and certification of miscellaneous items. They include:
Persons wishing to form a corporation, limited partnership or limited liability company register in the Office of the Secretary of State. Foreign corporations (those formed in other states or countries) who desire to transact business in Oklahoma must also file in this office. 
The Secretary's department issues trademark renewals, assignments and cancellations.
The Secretary of State appoints and commissions notaries public. Each notary public is required to file a $1,000 surety bond with the court clerk in their county of residence. Once this bond is filed, the court clerk sends the bond to the Secretary of State where it is recorded and filed.
Every officer of a state agency, board, commission, court, institution, and the state legislature, before entering upon the duties of office, is required to file an oath of office and a loyalty oath with the Secretary of State.
All state agencies, boards, commissions and public trusts are required to file in the Office of the Secretary of State all meeting notices, including cancellations, postponements and rescheduling of meeting in compliance with state open meeting laws.
The Secretary of State acts as registered agent for all foreign corporations, limited partnerships and limited liability companies unless an additional agent has been appointed. The Secretary of State also acts as registered agent for any domestic corporation whose agent has resigned. 
Every mortgage, deed of trust, and instruments supplementary thereto of a public service corporation covering any real or personal property situated in this state made to secure any indebtedness incurred pursuant to law, shall be executed and acknowledged in the same manner as conveyances of real estate and shall be recorded or files with the Secretary of State. 
Every invention developer rendering or offering to render invention development services shall maintain a surety bond equal to either ten percent (10%) of the invention developer's gross income from the invention development business in this state during the invention developer's preceding fiscal year, or twenty-five thousand dollars ($25,000), whichever is larger. A copy of the bond shall be approved by the Attorney General and filed in the Office of the Secretary of State before the invention developer renders or offers to render invention development services in this state. 
Every mineral owner or lessee who is engaged in drilling or preparing to drill for oil or gas is required to file a corporate surety bond, letter of credit from a banking institution, cash, or a certificate of deposit with the Secretary of State in the sum of $25,000. The Secretary of State is required by law to file and record each bond filed. 
Required to file and/or certify policy statements of each public institution of higher education. Personality rights as successor-in-interest, public trust indentures and amendments thereto, preliminary and final official statements, facsimile signatures.

Office of the Secretary of State

Organization
Secretary of State
Administration Division
Accounting Division
Information Services Division
Central Filing Division
Notary Division
Business Services Division
Executive and Legislative Services Division
Office of Administrative Rules

The Office of Administrative Rules (OAR) is one of the most important offices within the Office of the Secretary of State. OAR files state agency rules, rulemaking notices, executive orders and compiles those rules, rulemaking notices, executive orders, and local project announcements for publication in The Oklahoma Register, which OAR publishes semi-monthly. OAR is also responsible for compiling and codifying the permanent rules and executive orders for publication in The Oklahoma Administrative Code (OAC). OAC is the codification of the general and permanent rules and regulations issued by the executive departments and agencies of the state government. OAR publishes the OAC in annual supplements.

Staff
The Office of the Secretary of State, with an annual budget of over $4 million, is one of the smaller employers of the State. For fiscal year 2011, the Office was authorized 37 full-time employees.

Budget
The Office of the Secretary of State's budget is generated primarily be fees it generates from the entities it regulates. Agency fees make up 90% ($3.8 million) with the remaining 10% ($0.4 million) coming from annual appropriations from the Oklahoma Legislature.

For fiscal year 2011, each of the operating units of the Bureau operate with the following budgets:

Salary
The annual salary of the Secretary of State is set by law at $90,000.

Agencies overseen
The Secretary of State oversees the following state entities:
Oklahoma Council on Judicial Complaints
Oklahoma State Election Board
Oklahoma Ethics Commission
Oklahoma Judicial Nominating Commission
Oklahoma Department of Libraries

Oath of office
"I, . . . . . . . , do solemnly swear (or affirm) that I will support, obey, and defend the Constitution of the United States, and the Constitution of the State of Oklahoma, and that I will not, knowingly, receive, directly or indirectly, any money or other valuable thing, for the performance or nonperformance of any act or duty pertaining to my office, other than the compensation allowed by law; I further swear (or affirm) that I will faithfully discharge my duties as Secretary of State of Oklahoma to the best of my ability."

Officeholders
Statewide election (1907–1975)

Gubernatorial appointment (1975–present)

See also
List of company registers

References

External links
Official Secretary of State of Oklahoma Webpage
List of Former Secretaries

Oklahoma State Cabinet